Soodhu Kavvum is a 2013 Indian Tamil-language black comedy crime film written and directed by Nalan Kumarasamy. It features Vijay Sethupathi, Bobby Simha, Ashok Selvan, Ramesh Thilak, Karunakaran and Sanchita Shetty in the lead roles.

The film was released on 1 May 2013. The main concept is about how silly talk has engulfed people's day-to-day life and modern society. Soodhu Kavvum received positive reviews from critics and became a big blockbuster. The film was remade in Telugu as Gaddam Gang and into an Urdu language Pakistani movie titled as Chupan Chupai.

Plot 
Friends Kesavan, Sekar, and Pagalavan meet Das, a middle-age man who does low-profile kidnappings for a living with his imaginary girlfriend Shalu. Since they are broke, the trio decides to become his assistants. Das follows five rules of kidnapping (which he spells and writes as "kednaping"), the first of which is to avoid kidnapping people from political backgrounds.

One day, the Das gang kidnap a boy and successfully obtain ransom money from his father Nambikkai Kannan. Nambikkai's contractor brother has been arrested for attempted bribery by State Minister Gnanodayam, a honest politician. Impressed with Das's kidnapping skills, Nambikkai asks him to kidnap Gnanodayam's son Arumai Pragasam as revenge and offers to pay Das up to 20 million. Das initially hesitates, but eventually agrees after being convinced by Kesavan, Sekar and Pagalavan.

The next day, the Das gang set out to kidnap Arumai but are astonished to see him be kidnapped by another group. They kidnap Arumai from the other kidnappers and discover that the first kidnapping was staged by Arumai himself to extort money from his father. Arumai manages to convince Das and his men to collude with him to obtain ransom money from his father. The group demands 20 million from the minister and receives the money.

An argument over splitting the cash arises between Arumai and the rest during which their van loses control and falls from a bridge. Arumai runs away with all the money. The minister seeks the assistance of encounter specialist Bramma, a ruthless policeman to hunt down the kidnappers. Arumai returns to his house and hides the money in his room. Das devices a plan to kidnap Arumai again to retrieve the money. They accidentally meet Arumai and successfully kidnap him again. Das lets Arumai go free, after making him promise that he should not tell anything about them to the police. Arumai also promises to return their share of the money. Bramma learns that Arumai staged his own kidnapping and uses this information to threaten Arumai into testifying against the Das gang.

Arumai perjures that the Das gang did not kidnap him, leading to their acquittal. Enraged, Bramma takes the gang to a remote location, brutally beats them in a dark room with the aid of NVG, and raises his department gun to kill them. Instead of shooting them with the officially issued gun, he goes out and retrieves from his police jeep an illegal homemade gun that he had seized from a crook. When he inserts it behind his back in his pants, the rusty gun misfires into Bramma's buttocks, allowing the Das gang to escape. Arumai's father breaks in and takes the money bag to the chief minister, who provided the ransom money. When he opens the bag, the minister is shocked to find it filled with newspapers instead of cash. Arumai had transferred the cash to another bag and gives the Das gang their share.

The chief minister calls Arumai to his office and asks him to stand as a candidate in the upcoming general elections in lieu of his father, who never brought much income to the party due to his refusal to be corrupt. The chief minister praises Arumai's shrewdness and believes that he can rake in a substantial income of 3 billion in five years for the party, as a young minister. Arumai wins the elections, becomes MLA, immediately gets a minister post, and appoints Sekar and Kesavan as his personal advisers, while Pagalavan becomes an actor. Das continues his kidnapping business with a new band of young men. They kidnap a woman who looks exactly like Shalu, belatedly realising that she is Shalini Gupta, a minister's daughter. Thus, Das has broken his first rule of kidnapping again.

Cast 

 Vijay Sethupathi as Das
 Bobby Simha as Pagalavan
 Ashok Selvan as Kesavan
 Ramesh Thilak as Sekhar
 Karunakaran as G Arumai Pragasam (Minister at end)
 Sanchita Shetty as Shalini "Shalu" Gupta, Das’s imaginary girlfriend 
 M. S. Bhaskar as Finance Minister Gnanodayam
 Yog Japee as Inspector K. Bramma
 Radha Ravi as Chief Minister of Tamil Nadu
 Munishkanth as Drug Seller
 Aruldoss as Rowdy Doctor/Das's brother
 Anjali Rao as Kesavan's colleague
 Karthik Subbaraj as Jaguar Car Owner
 Yogi Babu as Rowdy Doctor's henchman
 Shivakumar as Nambikkai Kannan
 Boys Rajan as C Manikandan
 Radha as Arumai's mother
 Gajaraj as lawyer
 Noble K James
 Gaana Bala in special appearance in the song 'Kaasu Panam'
 Anthony Daasan in special appearance in the song 'Kaasu Panam'

Soundtrack 

The soundtrack album and background music was composed by Santhosh Narayanan. The audio rights were purchased by Think Music. Adhi from the Hiphop Tamizha duo wrote the lyrics for the track "Sudden Delight" while the rest of the tracks were written by GKB, Sean Roldan, Muthamil, Nalan Kumaraswamy and Gana Bala. The soundtrack album was released on 27 March 2013 at Sathyam Cinemas, Chennai. Celebrities such as Vaibhav Reddy, Karthik Subbaraj, Nanditha, K. S. Srinivasan, Ravindar Chandrasekaran, were present at the event along with the film's cast and crew.

The album received positive reviews. Behindwoods rated the album 2.5 out of 5, saying it as "Big ideas. Good returns." Indiaglitz rated the album 2.75 out of 5, and stated it as "The best of Santhosh Narayanan". Top10 Cinema gave favourable reviews, stating that "On the whole, the album introduces some new genre of music and Santhosh Narayanan deserves a special pat for this. Much alike his previous album Pizza, the visuals would add more beautifications to his music" and gave a verdict "Buy it for Come Na Come & Sudden Delight"

However, later on, the soundtrack went on to be one of the most respected soundtracks in Tamil cinema. It introduced new genres of music to the Tamil audience. Santhosh Narayanan built his own fanbase for diverging from the mainstream musical ideologies and delivering something new.

Release 
The satellite rights of the film were sold to Zee Tamil. Soodhu Kavvum was released on 1 May 2013 alongside Ethir Neechal and Moondru Per Moondru Kadhal.

Critical reception 
Soodhu Kavvum opened to positive reviews. Baradwaj Rangan from The Hindu stated "Nalan Kumarasamy's Soodhu Kavvum is a demonstration of what's possible when films are made for the sheer joy of making films. There isn't a single calculated moment, something cynically aimed to satisfy this segment of the audience or that one. Everything is organic, the events rooted in a nutty story and sprouting through a brilliant screenplay". S Saraswathi from Rediff gave 3.5 stars out of 5 and wrote "Soodhu Kavvum is an engaging film, with ingenious characters and entertaining situations" and called it a "must-watch". N Venkateswaran from The Times of India gave 4 out of 5 stars and wrote "Nalan Kumarasamy establishes himself as a director to watch out for in this laugh riot of a debut film. Carrying off a dark comedy is no mean task, but Nalan hits the target right in his first attempt. His writing is crisp, the lines are down to earth and funny, the characters well-etched and the screenplay has no dull moments". Sify wrote "Soodhu Kavvum works big time due to smart writing and perfect characterisation. Final verdict on Soodhu Kavvum is that it is a gutsy great film. It is one of the best films to have emerged out of Kollywood in a long, long time". Cinemalead wrote "Soodhu Kavvum is definitely a new attempt in Tamil cinema, go for it."

Malini Mannath from The New Indian Express wrote "Engaging screenplay, deft narration, well-etched characters and twists and humour generated at unexpected moments, make Soodhu Kavvum a wacky jolly fun ride". Behindwoods gave 3 stars out of 5 and said "Soodhu Kavvum’s scoring area is definitely its characterisations as Nalan Kumarasamy offers each of the central characters a back story that's unique and more importantly contributing to the character's present circumstance".  Vivek Ramz from In rated the film 3.5 out of 5 and wrote "Soodhu Kavvum is a total laugh riot!

Sudhish Kamath later picked Soodhu Kavvum as one of five films that have redefined Tamil cinema in 2013, writing, "This film is a joy to watch, full of laughs and unpredictable situations with great wit, dark humour and satire. Writer-director Nalan Kumarasamy, the winner of the first season of Nalaya Iyakkunar, is one of the most exciting filmmakers of our times with his ability to turn a cliché on the head".

Soodhu Kavvum was featured in Indo-Asian News Service's 10 best southern films of 2013, who called it "unarguably the funniest film of the year". Sify and Rediff listed it in the year-end top Tamil films lists, too.

Soodhu Kavvum was selected for screening in the Zurich Film Festival, being the only Tamil film of 2013 to be screened there.

Box office 
Soodhu Kavvum grossed  in Chennai theatres on its first weekend. In its opening weekend it grossed  in the US which was a disappointing result. The film had collected   in two weeks in Tamil Nadu, according to IANS. In June 2013, IANS reported that it had earned .

Remakes 
PVP Cinema purchased the Telugu remake rights in July 2013. The film has been remade in Telugu as Gaddam Gang. The Kannada remake rights were bought by Rockline Venkatesh. Director Rohit Shetty had been signed for 250 million to direct the Hindi remake. It was unofficially remade in Pakistan in Urdu language as Chupan Chupai.

After the success of Soodhu Kavvum, the producer of the movie C.V.Kumar had planned to make a sequel to the movie which was to be titled as Soodhu Kavvum 2 and the script work was said to have been done by Nalan Kumarasamy himself.

References

External links 
 

2010s comedy thriller films
2013 films
Indian comedy thriller films
Indian black comedy films
Films scored by Santhosh Narayanan
2010s Tamil-language films
Tamil films remade in other languages
Indian crime comedy films
2013 directorial debut films
2010s crime comedy films